Fred Arthur Braceful (May 2, 1938 – March 17, 1995) was a jazz drummer.

Early life
Braceful was born in Detroit on May 2, 1938. He played in his tenor saxophonist father's band early in his career. He served in the U.S. military in Germany, and then settled in Stuttgart.

Later life and career
In Stuttgart he played with Wolfgang Dauner's trio from 1963, and in Dauner's group Et Cetera until the mid-1970s. Braceful also played with Albert Mangelsdorff, Abdullah Ibrahim, Joki Freund, Hans Koller, Bob Degen, Benny Bailey, Robin Kenyatta, and Manfred Schoof.

He and several Stuttgart jazz musicians formed the ensemble Moira in 1976. After his stint with Oliver in 1982, Braceful quit music for a period of time, then returned to play in Eugen de Ryck's group the Funkomatic Hippies from 1992 until 1995. He worked and recorded with saxophonist Michael Hornstein in the same period. Braceful died in Munich on March 17, 1995.

Discography
With Wolfgang Dauner
 Dream Talk (CBS, 1964)
 Free Action (MPS, 1967)
 Requiem for Che Guevara with Fred van Hove (MPS, 1968)
 The Oimels (MPS, 1969)
 Wolfgang Dauner/Eberhard Weber/Jürgen Karg/Fred Braceful (Calig, 1969)
 Output (ECM, 1970)
 Rischkas Soul (MPS, 1970)
 Musica Sacra Nova II with Reinhold Finkbeiner (Schwann, 1970)
 Et Cetera (Global, 1971)
 Knirsch (MPS, 1972)
 Et Cetera Live (MPS, 1973)

With Mal Waldron
 Spanish Bitch (JVC/ECM, 1971)
 The Call (JAPO, 1971)

With Exmagma
 Exmagma (Neusi, 1973)
 Goldball (Disjuncta, 1975)
 3 (Daily, 2006)

With others
 Echoes from the Prague Jazz Festival with Leo Wright, Benny Bailey (Supraphon Rec, 1964)
 Bob Degen, Celebrations (Calig, 1968)
 Robin Kenyatta, Girl from Martinique (ECM, 1970)
 Michael Hornstein, Langsames Blau (Enja, 1994)
  and Mal Waldron, Black Issues (Chazra, 1994)

References

External links
 ExMagma

1938 births
1995 deaths
American jazz drummers
Avant-garde jazz drummers
20th-century American drummers
American male drummers
20th-century American male musicians
American male jazz musicians